The Dortmund Zoo is the zoological garden of Dortmund, Germany. It is specialized in the keeping and breeding of South American species and is leading in the breeding of the giant anteater, the tamandua and the giant otter. The zoo is situated in the south of the city between the boroughs of Hacheney and Brünninghausen.

Animals 

 Amur leopard
 Angola giraffe
 Bat-eared fox
 Capybara
 Common squirrel monkey
 Coypu
 Emperor tamarin
 Himalayan tahr
 Indian peafowl
 Jaguar
 Lesser Panda
 Maned wolf
 Meerkat
 Oncilla
 Patagonian mara
 Roe deer
 Siamang
 Two-toed sloth
 Yellow mongoose
 Western pygmy marmoset
 White rhinoceros
 Woylie

Gallery

References

Zoos in Germany
Dortmund